Benedita may refer to:

Places
Benedita, Portugal, A  freguesia (civil parish) of Alcobaça Municipality, Portugal

People
Benedita Barata da Rocha (born 1949), immunologist
Benedita da Silva (born 1943), Brazilian politician
Benedita Pereira (born 1985), Portuguese actress
Infanta Benedita of Portugal (1746–1829), Portuguese infanta, daughter of King Joseph I of Portugal and his wife Marianne Victoria of Borbón
Maria Benedita Bormann (1853–1895), Brazilian writer of feminist novels and other works using the pseudonym Délia
Maria Benedita Mouzinho de Albuquerque de Faria Pinho (1865–1939), Portuguese writer, translator, teacher, propagandist, republican activist and feminist activist